The Knights of the Quest (Italian: "I Cavalieri che fecero l'impresa") is a 2001 Italian film directed by Pupi Avati starring Edward Furlong, Raoul Bova and Thomas Kretschmann.

Plot

Cast 

 Raoul Bova as Giacomo of Altogiovanni
 Edward Furlong as  Simon of Clarendon
 Thomas Kretschmann as  Vanni delle Rondini
 Marco Leonardi as  Ranieri of Panico
 Stanislas Merhar as  Jean de Cent Acres
 Carlo Delle Piane as  Giovanni from Cantalupo
 F. Murray Abraham as  Delfinello from Coverzano
 Gigliola Cinquetti as  The Mother Superior 
 Edmund Purdom as  Hugh of Clarendon
 Yorgo Voyagis as Isacco Sathas
 Cesare Cremonini as  Monk

References

External links
 

2001 films
2000s historical drama films
Italian historical drama films
French historical drama films
Films set in the 13th century
Films directed by Pupi Avati
Films scored by Riz Ortolani
2001 drama films
2000s Italian-language films
2000s French-language films
2000s French films
2000s Italian films